The Holiday Bowl is a post-season NCAA Division I Football Bowl Subdivision college football bowl game that has been played in San Diego since 1978. San Diego County Credit Union has been the game's title sponsor since 2017, and the bowl has been officially known as the San Diego County Credit Union Holiday Bowl.

Past editions of the bowl were played at San Diego Stadium. Future editions are planned to be played at Petco Park in San Diego, under a five-year arrangement reached in 2021.  Petco Park, the baseball park of the San Diego Padres, will be reconfigured to accommodate a football field. San Diego Stadium was demolished beginning in the autumn of 2020. The bowl was not played following the 2020 and 2021 seasons, due to impact from the COVID-19 pandemic.

History
The Holiday Bowl was founded in 1978 to give the Western Athletic Conference an automatic bowl bid after the Fiesta Bowl, which previously had a tie-in with the conference, ended its association with the WAC following the departure of Arizona and Arizona State (the latter of which served as the game's host) to join the Pacific-8 Conference in the summer of 1978. The Holiday Bowl inherited the Fiesta Bowl's former WAC ties and gave the conference's champion its automatic bid. For the first several editions, the WAC champion played an at-large team; from 1991 through 1994, the Big Ten Conference was given the second bid, provided it had enough bowl-eligible teams.

Beginning in 1995, the Big Eight Conference replaced the Big Ten and remained tied with the bowl through as the conference expanded to become the Big 12 the following year. The WAC's automatic bid was split, with first choice given to the Cotton Bowl Classic in Dallas, and a team from the Pacific-10 Conference was added as the alternate pick (meaning that, if the WAC champion played in the Cotton Bowl, a Pac-10 team would play in the Holiday Bowl). The WAC ended its association with the Holiday Bowl after 1997, and the game became a matchup between the Big 12 and Pac-10.

From 1998 to 2009, the matchup featured the #2 Pac-12 team and the #3 Big 12 team, but the Alamo Bowl outbid the Holiday Bowl to feature that matchup beginning in 2010. Holiday Bowl Executive Director Bruce Binkowski stated that average ticket prices for the Holiday Bowl would have had to be increased from $60 to $100 to match the Alamo Bowl's offer of a $3 million payout (the Holiday Bowl was only offering $2.35 million). The Pac-12 and Big 12 retained their contracts with the Holiday Bowl, however, and the 2010–2013 matchups pitted the #3 Pac-12 team against the #5 Big 12 team.

Starting with the 2014 game, the Big Ten signed a six-year contract to return after a 20-year absence to the Holiday Bowl, regaining the slot that it had held from 1991 to 1994. With this agreement, the Holiday Bowl featured the #3 Pac-12 team and the #4 Big Ten team. In 2019, the bowl announced plans to host a Pac-12 team and an ACC team during the 2020 through 2025 games.

Since 2017, the sponsor has been San Diego County Credit Union, which formerly sponsored San Diego's other bowl game, the now-defunct Poinsettia Bowl. In 2015 and 2016, the title sponsor was National Funding, a San Diego-based alternative lender. Previous sponsors have included SeaWorld, Thrifty Car Rental, Chrysler Corporation (through its Plymouth brand), Culligan,  Pacific Life, Bridgepoint Education, and National University.

On October 22, 2020, organizers canceled the 2020 edition of the bowl, citing complications from the COVID-19 pandemic in the United States. The 2021 edition was called off hours before kickoff on December 28, due to COVID-19 protocol issues within the UCLA program, and officially canceled the next morning, after organizers could not secure a replacement team to face NC State.

Notable games

For the first seven games, BYU represented the WAC as its champion. In the inaugural 1978 game, the Navy Midshipmen came in with an 8–3 record and a Commander-in-Chief's Trophy and then capped their season with a 23–16 comeback victory over the highly favored Cougars.  BYU has played in a total of 11 Holiday Bowls, more than any other team.  The 1980 game was known as "The Miracle Bowl" as BYU erased a 20-point SMU lead in the last two minutes of the game, tying the score on the last play of the game—a 60-yard pass from All-American quarterback Jim McMahon to tight end Clay Brown as time expired. BYU kicker Kurt Gunther added the game-winning extra point.

The 1983 game between BYU and Missouri had its own dramatic ending, as BYU rallied behind All-American quarterback Steve Young. With just 23 seconds left, Young gave a handoff to Eddie Stinnett. Stinnett then turned around and passed it back to Steve Young, who caught it and ran in for a touchdown, giving BYU a 21–17 win. Young achieved a rare feat in college football: one touchdown pass, one touchdown run, and one touchdown reception all in a single game. For his efforts, he was named offensive MVP.

One year later, BYU, led by their longtime coach, LaVell Edwards, secured the national championship in the Holiday Bowl by defeating the Michigan Wolverines, coached by Bo Schembechler, 24–17. Because of the WAC's contract with the Holiday Bowl, BYU, top-ranked and the only undefeated team in Division I-A going into that season's bowls, was obligated to play in the mid-tier Holiday Bowl against a mediocre (6–5) Michigan squad. Again, the Holiday Bowl came down to the final few plays. BYU drove the length of the field and scored on a pass from injured All-American quarterback Robbie Bosco to Kelly Smith with 1:23 remaining. Marv Allen, who also played in the very first Holiday Bowl as a redshirt freshman in 1978, sealed the victory with an interception.

Game results
Rankings are based on the AP Poll prior to the game being played.

Source:

MVPs

The bowl names offensive and defensive MVPs; in some instances, co-MVPs have been named, or two offensive MVPs in lieu of a defensive MVP.

Source:

Most appearances
Updated through the December 2022 edition (43 games, 86 total appearances).

Teams with multiple appearances

Teams with a single appearance
Won (12): Arkansas, Baylor, Colorado, Hawaii, Indiana, Michigan State, Minnesota, Navy, Northwestern, Oklahoma, Penn State, Wisconsin

Lost (6): Illinois, North Carolina, San Diego State, SMU, UCLA, Utah

Every Pac-12 school except Stanford and Oregon State has appeared in the game (Colorado appeared while a member of the Big 12). The only current or former Big 12 members that have not played in the bowl are Iowa State, TCU, Kansas, and West Virginia.

Appearances by conference
Updated through the December 2022 edition (43 games, 86 total appearances).

 Pac-12 record includes appearances when the conference was known as the Pac-10 (before 2011).
 Conferences that are defunct or no longer active in FBS are marked in italics.
 Independent appearances: Navy (1978), Penn State (1989)

Game records

Source:

Media coverage

The bowl has been broadcast by Mizlou (1978–1984), Lorimar (1985), ESPN (1986–2016) and FS1 (2017–2019). Fox was scheduled to air the 2021 edition of the game, however the game was cancelled due to the Covid-19 pandemic.

Notes

References

External links
 

 
College football bowls
American football in San Diego
Recurring sporting events established in 1978
1978 establishments in California